Shannon Woodward (born December 17, 1984) is an American actress. She is best known for her roles as Sabrina Collins on the FOX sitcom Raising Hope (2010–2014), Elsie Hughes on the HBO science-fiction thriller series Westworld (2016–2018), and the voice and motion capture of Dina in the video game The Last of Us Part II, for which she received a BAFTA Award for Performer in a Supporting Role nomination at the 17th British Academy Games Awards.

Early life
Shannon Woodward was born in Phoenix, Arizona, on December 17, 1984.

Career
Woodward's first on-screen acting job came in 1991 when she played the occasionally recurring role of Missy on Nickelodeon's television series Clarissa Explains It All. She reprised this role twice during the show's five seasons. Woodward next appeared in made-for-television films: Family Reunion: A Relative Nightmare (1995) and Tornado! (1996). In 1997, she played an uncredited role in the CBS miniseries True Women.

Between 2000 and 2007, Woodward played a number of minor roles in various television shows including The Drew Carey Show, Grounded for Life, Malcolm in the Middle, Crossing Jordan, Without a Trace, Psych, and Boston Public.

Woodward's big-screen debut came in 2005, when she played Emma Sharp, the daughter of a Texas Ranger assigned to protect a group of cheerleaders who witnessed a murder in the action comedy Man of the House.

In 2007, Woodward got her big break in the series The Riches, which aired for two seasons (2007–2008) on cable network FX. She played the role of Di Di Malloy, the teen daughter and middle child in an American family of Irish Travellers. After The Riches ended, Woodward played the role of Leah in the film The Haunting of Molly Hartley.

Woodward shot the 2009 pilot Limelight, about a New York City school for performing arts, but the series was not picked up. That same year, Woodward had a recurring role on the final season of NBC's ER, as Kelly Taggart, the younger sister of nurse Samantha "Sam" Taggart. She also starred in another teen thriller, The Shortcut.

In 2010, Woodward starred in the independent drama Girlfriend. She also played the lead character in the 2015 ensemble comedy-drama The Breakup Girl. 

From September 2010 to April 2014, Woodward had a starring role in the FOX sitcom Raising Hope, playing Sabrina Collins, a grocery store checkout clerk who is the love interest of the series lead.

Woodward appeared in her friend Katy Perry's music video "Hot n Cold" and had a cameo role in Perry's documentary/concert film Katy Perry: Part of Me. Perry, in turn, guest-starred in a season two episode of Raising Hope.

Woodward played Lois in the 2017 film All Nighter. She was a regular in two seasons of HBO series Westworld as computer programmer Elsie Hughes.

It was announced in April 2017 that Woodward would appear in The Last of Us Part II, which was released on June 19, 2020. Woodward played Dina, the main character Ellie's friend and love interest.

Personal life
Woodward came out as queer in February 2021.

Filmography

Film

Television

Music videos

Video games

References

External links
 
 
 

1984 births
Living people
20th-century American actresses
21st-century American actresses
Actresses from Florida
American child actresses
American film actresses
American queer actresses
American television actresses
American voice actresses
American video game actresses
Actresses from Phoenix, Arizona
Queer women